The Theban Tomb TT64 is located in Sheikh Abd el-Qurna. It forms part of the Theban Necropolis, situated on the west bank of the Nile opposite Luxor. The tomb is the burial place of the ancient Egyptian Hekerneheh, who was a King's Tutor of Prince Amenhotep during the reign of Tuthmosis IV and lived into the reign of Amenhotep III in the Eighteenth Dynasty.

Hekerneheh is shown with the King's son Amenhotep, who would later become Amenhotep III. Behind Hekerneheh six royal princes are shown. One of them is a prince Amenemhat, who was a son of Tuthmosis IV and whose canopic jars were found in his father's tomb KV43.

See also
 List of Theban tombs
 N. de Garis Davies, Nina and Norman de Garis Davies, Egyptologists

References

External links
 Scans of Norman and Nina De Garis Davies' tracings from Theban Tomb 64 (external).

Buildings and structures completed in the 13th century BC
Theban tombs
Buildings and structures of the Eighteenth Dynasty of Egypt